Glucan 1,3-beta-glucosidase (exo-1,3-beta-glucosidase, beta-1,3-glucan exo-hydrolase, exo (1->3)-glucanohydrolase, 1,3-beta-glucan glucohydrolase) is an enzyme with systematic name 3-beta-D-glucan glucohydrolase. This enzyme catalyses the following chemical reaction

 Successive hydrolysis of beta-D-glucose units from the non-reducing ends of (1->3)-beta-D-glucans, releasing alpha-glucose

Acts on oligosaccharides, but very slowly on laminaribiose.

References

External links 
 

EC 3.2.1